Cork City F.C. is an Irish football (soccer) club who play in the League of Ireland. City were founded and elected to the league in 1984. Here is a list of all former players.

A 
Tobi Adebayo-Rowling
Stuart Ashton
John Andrews
Stuart Ashton

B 
Paul Bannon
Aaron Barry
Dave Barry
Brian Barry-Murphy
Steven Beattie
Denis Behan
Dougie Bell
Alan Bennett
Liam Bossin
Paul Bowdren
Gary Boylan
Trevor Brooking
Kenny Browne
Willie Bruton
Anthony Buckley
Garry Buckley
Jody Byrne
Willie Byrne

C 
Achille Campion
Mel Capleton
Colm Carroll
Ollie Cahill
Matthew Carr
Alan Carey
Brian Carey 
Dan Casey
Ryan Casey
 John Caulfield
Karl Caulfield
Peter Cherrie
Anthony Connolly
Dan Connor
Cormac Cotter
Derek Coughlan
Paul Coughlan
Ronan Coughlan
Kieran Crotty
Conor Crowley
Gareth Cronin
Graham Cummins
Mick Conroy

D 
Deshane Dalling
Declan Daly
Shane Daly-Butz
Conor Davis
Iarfhlaith Davoren
Paul Deasy
Billy Dennehy
Darren Dennehy
Damien Delaney
Ryan Delaney
Michael Devine
Reyon Dillon
Kieran Djilali
Gerald Dobbs
Stephen Dooley
Kevin Doyle
Lawrie Dudfield
Craig Duggan
Shane Duggan
Pat Duggan
John Dunleavy

E 
Tony Eeles
Anthony Elding
Connor Ellis
Vincent Escude-Candau

F 
Neale Fenn
Kelvin Flanagan
Charlie Fleming
Stephen Folan
Eoin Forde
Danny Furlong
Patsy Freyne

G 
Joe Gamble
Steve Gaughan
Ross Gaynor
Tommy Gaynor
Matty Gillam
Fergal Giltenan
Johnny Glynn
Shane Guthrie
Shane Griffin

H 
Paul Hague 
Phil Harrington 
Noel Hartigan
Colin Healy
Noel Healy
Pat Healy
Robbie Hedderman
Willie Heffernan
Stephen Henderson
Ian Hennessy
Mark Herrick
Dave Hill
Rob Hindmarch (Player Manager)
Gavan Holohan
Colm Horgan
Daryl Horgan
Neal Horgan
Declan Hyde

I 
Dominic Iorfa

K 
Jason Kabia
Danny Kane
Daryl Kavanagh
Gavin Kavanagh
John Kavanagh
Jimmy Keohane
John Kelleher
Paul Kelleher
Liam Kearney
Sean Kelly
Mike Kerley
Tim Kiely
Ciarán Kilduff
Faz Kuduzovic

L 
Ray Lally
Rob Lehane
Brian Lenihan
Kevin Long
Philip Long
Shane Long
Thomas Long
 Oswald Lopes
Cillian Lordan
Cathal Lordan
Alex Ludzic

M 
Sean Maguire
Garan Manley
Gerry McCabe 
Conor McCarthy
Conor McCormack 
Terry McDermott
Sean McLoughlin 
Barry McNamee
Leon McSweeney
Micky Mellon
David Meyler 
Liam Miller
Dave Mooney 
Noel Mooney
Dave Moore
Pat Morley
Cillian Morrison
Danny Morrissey
Gearoid Morrissey
Rory Morrissey
Dave Mulcahy
Kevin Mulcahy
Stephen Mulcahy
Michael Mulconroy
Jimmy Mulligan
Danny Murphy
Darren Murphy
Liam Murphy
Kevin Murray
Dan Murray
Kieran Myers

N 
Christian Nanetti
Stephen Napier
Kieran Nagle
Ollie Nagle
Liam Nash
Jamie Nolan
Michael Nwankwo
Phil Neiland
Barry Neiland
Tony Neiland

O 
Colin P. O'Brien
Colin T. O'Brien
Derek O'Brien
Liam O'Brien
Trevor O'Brien
George O'Callaghan 
Brian O'Callaghan 
Henry Ochieng
Damian O'Connell
Eoghan O'Connell
Alan O'Connor
Daire O'Connor
Kevin O'Connor
Rory O'Connor
Shane O'Connor
Stephen O'Donnell
Fergus O'Donohgue
Roy O'Donovan
John O'Flynn
Stephen O'Flynn
Chiedozie Ogbene
Conor O'Grady
Greg O'Halloran
Josh O'Hanlon
Don O'Keeffe
Joseph Olowu
Davin O'Neill
Josh O'Shea
Mark O'Sullivan

P 
Andy Packer
Pierce Phillips
Gary Philpott
Tadhg Purcell
Keigan Parker

R 
Michael Rafter
Darragh Rainsford
Joe Redmond
Declan Roche
Dave Rogers
Adam Rundle
Darragh Ryan
Tadhg Ryan

S 
Kieran Sadlier
Rimvydas Sadauskas
Admir Softic
Karl Sheppard
Guntars Siligailis
Alan Smith
Dan Smith
Kalen Spillane
Kyron Stabana
Pat Sullivan
Vinny Sullivan

T 
James Tilley
Ian Turner
Tony Tynan

U 
Chidoze Ukoh

W 
David Warren
Robbie Williams
Billy Woods

References

 
Association football player non-biographical articles
Cork City